The Socialist Party of Tajikistan (Hizbi Sotsialistiyi Tojikiston) is a political party in Tajikistan. The party was founded on 15 June 1996, and registered on 6 August the same year. The party publishes Ittixod (Иттиход). The chairman of the party, Safarali Kenjayev, was assassinated in Dushanbe in 1999. Prior to his murder, there had been speculations that he might have intended to run for president.

In early 2004 the party was divided, with two groups claiming the name 'Socialist Party of Tajikistan'. One group was led by Abduhalim Ghafarov, a Ministry of Education official, and Kurbon Vosiev, a presidential adviser. The other group was led by Mirhuseyn Narziev. The Ghafarov-led group, which supports the government, obtained the legal registration.

References

Political parties established in 1996
1996 establishments in Tajikistan
Political parties in Tajikistan
Socialist parties in Asia